Ship to Shore is an Australian children's television series devised by David Rapsey and written by Glenda Hambly, John Rapsey, Mary Morris, Everett de Roche, Ysabelle Dean, Jon Stephens and others. The program was shown on the ABC and Channel 9 in Australia, on YTV in Canada, and briefly on Nickelodeon in the United States and the United Kingdom.

In September 2014, Greg Carroll, who played the show's bumbling security guard Hermes Endakis, announced he was writing a musical based on his Ship to Shore role.

Synopsis
The show centres around the lives of a group of children living on Circe Island, a fictional island off the coast of Perth, in Western Australia. Three series of the show were shot, one each in 1992, 1993 and 1996. Each episode was 24 minutes long.

The first series features comedy episodes of the children outwitting adults, particularly Hermes Endakis, played by Greg Carroll. The lead roles among the children were played by Clinton Voss, Jodi Herbert, Cleonie Morgon-Wootton and Heath Miller. Later series continued the comic tradition of the first series but included stories with social and environmental issues, particularly in the second series where the children try to stop a big corporation from destroying their island.

Cast

All Series
 Clinton Voss as "Kelvin Crump" (78 episodes, 1993–1996)
 Kimberley Stark as "Geraldine Crump" (78 episodes, 1993–1996)
 Francoise Sas as "Amy Docherty" (78 episodes, 1993–1996)
 Greg Carroll as "Hermes Endakis" (78 episodes, 1993–1996)

Series 1
 Jodi Herbert as "Julie Jones" (52 episodes, 1993–1994)
 Cleonie Morgan-Wootton as "Bianca "Babe" Keogh" (52 episodes, 1993–1994)
 Heath Miller as "Ralph Knowles" (52 episodes, 1993–1994)
 Ronald Underwood as "Billy Miller" (52 episodes, 1993–1994)
 Christie Pitts as "Sally Johnson" (52 episodes, 1993–1994)
 Ewen Leslie as "Guido" (52 episodes, 1993–1994)
 Eileen Colocott as "Mrs. Crawford" (28 episodes, 1993–1994)
 Brien Fitzsimmons as "Charlie Puckrin" (27 episodes, 1993–1994)
 Louise Miller as "Andrea Selby" (27 episodes, 1993–1994)
 Igor Sas as "Andrew Knowles" (27 episodes, 1993–1994)
 Kate Hall as "Helen" (27 episodes, 1993–1994)
 Xander Allan as "The Gobbler" (12 episodes 1993-1994)
 Caroline McKenzie as "Susan Crump" (27 episodes, 1993–1994)
 Rosalba Verucci as "Mrs. Bellini" (27 episodes, 1993–1994)
 Rob Hackney as "Gavin Garney" (1993–1994)
 Michael Loney as "Harry Crump"
 Michael Tukric as "Derek"

Series 2
 Jodi Herbert as "Julie Jones" (52 episodes, 1993–1994)
 Cleonie Morgan-Wootton as "Bianca "Babe" Keogh" (52 episodes, 1993–1994)
 Heath Miller as "Ralph Knowles" (52 episodes, 1993–1994)
 Ronald Underwood as "Billy Miller" (52 episodes, 1993–1994)
 Christie Pitts as "Sally Johnson" (52 episodes, 1993–1994)
 Ewen Leslie as "Guido" (52 episodes, 1993–1994)
 Rob Hackney as "Gavin Garney" (1993–1994)
 Louise Love as "Louella Docherty"
 Sara Kotai as "Victoria-Elizabeth Dafoe"
 Nicola Bartlett as "Rosalind Dafoe"
 Craig Hayes as "Beanpole"
 Brett Partridge as "Jake"
 Michael Turkic as "Derek"
 Ramsay Mclean as " Louden De Clair"

Series 3
 Adam Briggs as "Milan Radich"
 Joshua Crane as "Peter Puckrin" / "PP"
 Monica Main as "Madeleine Mabbs"
 Jemma Thomson as "Krystal Mabbs"
 Heath Bergersen as "Aaron"
 Benjamin Chow as "Garth Leong"
 April Locke as "Sandy Leong"
 John O'Brien as "James Leong"

Production notes
Series one was produced by David Rapsey and Barbi Taylor, series two and three by Barbi Taylor and Paul Barron, who was also the Executive Producer of all three series.

The series was filmed on location in Point Peron and Rockingham (Perth), with shots of Garden Island and the bridge to HMAS Stirling creating the feel of an island. Additional interior classroom filming was performed in Applecross Primary School, Applecross.

The show was produced by Barron Films Limited Production for Australia's ABC, Channel 9 and Ravensburger (Germany) with the support of the Film Finance Corporation of Australia and ScreenWest.

International airings
The series was also distributed internationally having been sold to China, Germany, Iceland, Ireland, Israel, The Netherlands, New Zealand, Spain, Portugal, Latin America, The United Kingdom and The United States.

References

External links
 
Ship to Shore Series 1 at the National Film and Sound Archive
Ship to Shore Series 2 at the National Film and Sound Archive

Australian children's television series
Australian Broadcasting Corporation original programming
Nine Network original programming
1993 Australian television series debuts
1996 Australian television series endings
Television shows set in Western Australia
English-language television shows
Television series about children